Bednarze may refer to the following places:
Bednarze, Lesser Poland Voivodeship (south Poland)
Bednarze, Łódź Voivodeship (central Poland)
Bednarze, Masovian Voivodeship (east-central Poland)